Jason W. Brown M.D (born April 14, 1938, in New York) is a neurologist and writer of works in neuropsychology and philosophy of mind. He has been a reviewer and recipient of grants and fellowships from the National Institutes of Health and the Alexander von Humboldt Foundation and is or has been on the editorial boards of leading journals in his field. He has written 14 books, edited 4 others, and more than 200 articles.

Dr. Brown is the founder and active chief neurologist of the Center For Cognition and Communication "CCC". He founded the entity in 1985 in New York City, and it has now become one of the nation's most highly specialized and elite private practices in evaluating and treating traumatic brain injury. Dr. Brown, along with his staff neuropsychologists, are reputed for patient care and expert testimony for injured patients.

Biography
Premedical studies at the University of California in Los Angeles, graduation from Berkeley in 1959. Medical school at the University of Southern California in Los Angeles, with M.D. in 1963, internship at St. Elizabeth's Hospital in Washington, D.C.

He returned to Los Angeles for a residency in neurology at UCLA. 1967–1969 in the Army, in Korea and San Francisco. In 1969, he took a post-doctoral fellowship at the Boston Veteran's Hospital. In 1970, he was invited to the staff of Columbia-Presbyterian Hospital in New York as assistant professor. In 1972, he published his first book, Aphasia, Apraxia, and Agnosia. In 1976, he received a fellowship from the Foundations Fund for Research in Psychiatry to spend a year at the Centre Neuropsychologique et Neurolinguistique in Paris. On his return, he joined the staff of New York University Medical Center, eventually as clinical professor in neurology. The academic year 1978–79 was spent as visiting associate professor at Rockefeller University.

The Center for Cognition and Communication (CCC) was established to provide treatment for clients with head injury, stroke, and other acquired and developmental disorders of cognition.

Since 2002, Prof. Jason W. Brown and his wife Carine house and co-organize the Whitehead Psychology Nexus workshops on South of France.

Awards
 COPERNICUS PRIZE 2003
 VIRTUTI MEDICINALI 2003

Books
 Authored

 Brown, J. W. (1972) Aphasia. Apraxia and Agnosia, Thomas, Springfield.
 Brown, J. W. (1977) Mind. Brain and Consciousness, Academic, New York.
  Brown, J. W. (1988) Life of the Mind, Erlbaum, New Jersey.
  Brown, J. W. (1991) Self and Process Springer-Verlag, New York.
  Brown, J. W. (1996) Time. Will and Mental Process, Plenum Press, N.Y.
  Brown, J. W. (2000) Mind and Nature: Essays on Time and Subjectivity, Whurr, London.
  Brown, J. W. (2001) The Embodied Self. Station Hill Press, New York.
  Brown, J. W. (2005) Process and the authentic life. Toward a psychology of value. Ontos Verlag, Heusenstamm.
  Brown, J. W. (2010) Neuropsychological Foundations of Conscious Experience. Les Editions Chromatika, Louvain-la-Neuve, Belgium.
  Brown, J. W. (2011) Gourmet's Guide to the Mind. Les Editions Chromatika, Louvain-la-Neuve, Belgium.
  Brown, J. W. (2012) Love and Other Emotions. Karnac Press, London.
  Brown, J. W. (2014) Microgenetic Theory and Process Thought. In preparation.
  Brown J.W. (2017) Metapsychology of the Creative Process. Continuous novelty as the ground of creative advance. Imprint Academic, Exeter.
  Brown J.W. (2017) Reflections on Mind and the Image of Nature. Resource Publications, Eugene, Oregon.
  Brown J.W. (2019) Amazon: Mental States and Conceptual Worlds
Браун Дж. В. Самовоплощающийся разум: процесс, динамика мозга и настоящее сознания (перевод: Жадяев Д.В.). - Днипро: Герда, 2019. - 336 с. [твердый переплет, 11 иллюстраций]  УДК 159.91/Б87
 Brown J.W. (2020) Thought and Object. Selected papers in process theory (in press)

 Edited

 Brown, J. W. (1973) Aphasia, tran. of A. Pick, Aphasie, Thomas, Springfield.
 Brown, J. W. (1981) Jargonaphasia (Ed.) Academic, New York.
 Brown, J. W. (1988) Agnosia and Apraxia (Ed.) Erlbaum, New Jersey.
 Brown, J. W. (1989) Neuropsychology of Perception, Erlbaum, New Jersey.

 See also
 Maria Pachalska and Michel Weber (eds.), Neuropsychology and Philosophy of Mind in Process. Essays in Honor of Jason W. Brown, Frankfurt / Lancaster, ontos verlag, Process Thought XVIII, 2008
 Michel Weber, "Jason W. Brown’s Microgenetic Theory: Reflections and Prospects," Neuro-psychoanalysis, Volume 4, No 1, 2002, pp. 117–118.

Articles
Dr. Brown has published over 200 articles.

Recent articles:

Brown J.W. (2013) in: Bradford, D. (2013) Microgenesis and the Mind/Brain State: Interview with Jason Brown, Mind and Matter, 11 (2) 183-203

Brown J.W. (2014) Feeling, Journal of Mind and Behavior,35

Brown, J.W. (2017) Microgenetic theory of perception, memory and the mental state  Journal of Consciousness Studies, 24:51-70

Brown, J.W. (2018) The nature of existence. In: Orpheus’ Glance: Selected papers on process philosophy, 2002–2017. P. Stenner and M. Weber Eds) Les Editions Chromatika, Belgium

Brown, J.W. (2018) A process theory of morality, In M. Pachalska and J. Kropotov (Eds) Psychology, Neuropsychology and Neurophysiology: Studies in Microgenetic Theory. IMPULS, Krakow

Brown, J.W. (2018) Memory and thought. In: Teixeira, M-T and Pickering, J. (Eds) Proceedings of the Whitehead conference in the Azores, 2017, Nature and Process. Cambridge Scholars Publishing, 2018–9, in press

Brown, J.W. (2018) Theoretical note on the nature of the present. Process Studies, 47.1-2 (2018): 163-171

Brown, J.W. (2018) Agency and the will. Mind and Matter, 16:195-212

Brown, J.W. (2020) Origins of subjective experience. The Journal of Mind and Behavior. Summer and Autumn 2020, Volume 41, #3 and 4. Pages 270-279

Brown J.W. (2020) Time and the dream, Neuropsychoanalysis, DOI: 10.1080/15294145.2020.1835527

Brown, J.W. (2021) The Mind/Brain State. The Journal of Mind and Behavior 42(1), 1-16

Brown, J.W., Zhadiaiev, D.V. (2022) Agency and Freedom "Philosophy, Economics and Law Review" Dnipropetrovsk State University of Internal Affairs (in press)

Brown, J.W., Zhadiaiev, D.V. (2022) From Drive to Value. Process Studies 1 November 2022; 51 (2): 204–220. doi: https://doi.org/10.5406/21543682.51.2.04, 2022

Brown, J.W. (2023) Agency and Freedom in Exploring Consciousness - From Non-Duality to Non-Locality (in press)

References

All articles written by Dr. Jason W. Brown  (www.drjbrown.org)

External links
https://www.youtube.com/watch?v=vTBfNBuOXd0
https://www.drjbrown.org/
https://web.archive.org/web/20100121164727/http://www.psychoscience.net/interviews_with_jason_brown.htm
https://www.youtube.com/watch?v=5qdL2YYR1a4
https://web.archive.org/web/20160502105859/http://www.ptneur.com/
http://philoctetes.org/Past_Programs/Recovering_Syntax_A_Poets_Struggle_with_Aphasia
http://www.jvra.com/expert/default.aspx?ref=1571
Academia.edu | Jason W. Brown

American neurologists
Philosophers of mind
1938 births
Living people
New York University Grossman School of Medicine faculty
Keck School of Medicine of USC alumni
University of California, Berkeley alumni
University of California, Los Angeles alumni